Thomas H. Caffrey (October 3, 1893 - October 1963) was a member of the Wisconsin State Assembly.

Biography
Caffrey was born on October 3, 1893, in South Bound Brook, New Jersey. He graduated from high school in Milwaukee, Wisconsin. During World War I, he served in the United States Army.

Political career
Caffrey represented the Fifteenth District of Milwaukee County, Wisconsin in the Assembly. He was a Democrat.

References

People from South Bound Brook, New Jersey
Politicians from Milwaukee
Military personnel from Milwaukee
United States Army soldiers
United States Army personnel of World War I
1893 births
1963 deaths
20th-century American politicians
Democratic Party members of the Wisconsin State Assembly